Lea Hansen may refer to:
 Lea Hansen (cricketer)
 Lea Hansen (handballer)